Gregory Landing is an unincorporated community in Clark County, in the U.S. state of Missouri.

History
Gregory Landing had its start in the 1830s as a shipping point on the Mississippi River. A post office called Gregory's Landing was established in 1868, and remained in operation until 1954.

References

Unincorporated communities in Clark County, Missouri
Unincorporated communities in Missouri